Caress is an unincorporated community in Braxton County, West Virginia, United States.

History
A post office called Caress was established in 1888, and remained in operation until it was discontinued in 1954. The community was probably named for a family of settlers.

References

Unincorporated communities in Braxton County, West Virginia
Unincorporated communities in West Virginia